Pattikaattu Ponnaiya is a 1973 Indian Tamil-language film, directed by B. S. Ranga. The film stars M. G. Ramachandran, Jayalalithaa and Rajasree. It was the last film to feature Ramachandran and Jayalalithaa together.

Plot
Ponnaiya is a farmer and the son of a farmer. His father owes money to Pannaiyar Paramasivam and he is given time to return the money or else lose his father who would not live if he loses his respect. He leaves his lover Kannama and comes to the city to make money. There, he fights and saves Singhaiya, a wrestler trainer. He joins under his tutelage, learns fighting and decides to join a tournament. Kannama initially comes in to marry him but understanding the situation supports him.

He faces the match and enters the finals where he faces against a master fighter who is revealed to be Muthaiya, his long-lost younger twin who is also in desperate need for money. How the two brothers join hands and solve both their problems is the rest of the story.

Cast

Production
Pattikaattu Ponnaiya was the last film to feature M. G. Ramachandran and Jayalalithaa together. Sahul served as stunt double for Ramachandran in a boxing scene.

Soundtrack
The music was composed by K. V. Mahadevan, while the lyrics were written by Kannadasan and Pulamaipithan.

Release and reception 
Pattikaattu Ponnaiya was released on 10 August 1973.

References

External links

1970s Tamil-language films
1973 films
Films directed by B. S. Ranga
Films scored by K. V. Mahadevan
Indian boxing films